Kwasi Buokrom is a town in the Brong Ahafo Region of Ghana. The town is known for the Our Lady of Providence Secondary School.  The school is a second cycle institution.

References

Populated places in the Brong-Ahafo Region